Hanse: Die Expedition is a strategic business simulation game released in 1994 by Ascon. The game was not released in an English-language version.

Gameplay and plot 
The player is a trader in the 13th Century, in the German seaport town of Lübeck. The aim is to become mayor of Lübeck within 250 turns.

External links 
 
 Powerplay review (German)
 ASM review (German)
 Amiga Joker review (German)

Ascaron games
1994 video games
Amiga games
DOS games
Video games developed in Germany